"Stronger" is a song by American rapper Kanye West, released as the second single from his third studio album, Graduation (2007). The production was handled by West, with an extended outro co-produced with Mike Dean. Written by a four-man team, the composition is electronic in nature, employing drums and synthesizers as the most prominent instruments. For the track, West repeats a vocal sample of "Harder, Better, Faster, Stronger" by French house duo Daft Punk in the background while he delivers lyrics about the resolve that comes when one is faced with adversity, paraphrasing Friedrich Nietzsche's dictum "What does not kill me makes me stronger" for the song's refrain. West has described the song as an "emancipation" as it allowed him to vent his frustration over mistakes made in the year prior.

The song's production process was arduous, with West and his team reportedly mixing the track over 75 times, including after its release as a single. Although he worked with eight audio engineers and eleven mix engineers around the world for the track, West still felt dissatisfied with the results and decided to enlist the aid of record producer Timbaland in redoing the drum programming to "Stronger" prior to the release of Graduation. West felt the result he achieved paled in comparison to the sampled original track by Daft Punk, but they were delighted by the song, leading to future collaborations. The single's music video, directed by Hype Williams, features sci-fi imagery based on the 1988 anime film Akira, and was shot largely in Tokyo, Japan. Kanye West's look, wearing shutter shades in the music video, became a signature of his in the late 2000s.

Released as a single on July 31, 2007, "Stronger" would top the Billboard Hot 100 several weeks later, becoming West's third number-one single. It was a top ten single in ten countries, topping the charts in Canada, New Zealand, United Kingdom and the United States. The song was praised by music critics. It was awarded a Grammy Award for Best Rap Solo Performance at the 50th Grammy Awards, and was named as one of the best songs of the year by Rolling Stone and Spin. The song's popularity has been credited to not only encouraging other hip-hop artists to incorporate house and electronica elements into their music, but also for playing a part in the revival of disco and electro-infused music in the ensuing years. "Stronger" has since sold five million copies in the United States, and was certified Diamond by the RIAA in 2021, making it one of the best-selling singles in the United States. In 2021, the song was included on Rolling Stone's 500 Greatest Songs of All Time.

Background

Prior to release, a portion of "Stronger" was first released in May 2007 on West's Can't Tell Me Nothing mixtape. On June 27, 2007, "Stronger" was added to the BBC Radio 1 Up-Front playlist and later upgraded to the A-List a month prior to its release. The single's front cover art was released on West's website on June 28, 2007. It was designed by Japanese artist Takashi Murakami, whom Kanye West collaborated with to produce the artwork for Graduation. The cover artwork features a cartoon version of West's mascot "Dropout Bear" wearing sunglasses similar to those West wears in the music video, as well as the small, trademark robot helmets of the Daft Punk duo Thomas Bangalter and Guy-Manuel de Homem-Christo.

"Stronger" musically derives from a vocal sample of "Harder, Better, Faster, Stronger" (2001) by French house duo Daft Punk. The use of the sample was requested by West through Pedro Winter, Daft Punk's manager at the time. The duo, who deeply enjoyed "Stronger", approved of the sample and are credited as co-writers on the track. West later met the Daft Punk musicians, Thomas Bangalter and Guy-Manuel de Homem-Christo, at Chicago music festival Lollapalooza. The recording sessions for "Stronger" were a turning point in the production process for West's third studio album Graduation, whereas West had been "aimlessly making songs" prior to this. The record began to take definite shape and form upon the creation of the track, which West released as the third album's second single, as well as around the filming of its accompanying music video, which was directed by music video director Hype Williams. The sci-fi imagery of the video inspired West to take his music in a more futuristic direction.

On July 3, 2007, West told Zane Lowe on BBC Radio 1 that although he believes "Stronger" is a great song, it does not compare to the sampled original . When asked about their take on hip-hop music and how rappers like West were suddenly fascinated by their music, Bangalter replied that, "Hip-hop has always been exciting and interesting to us." Daft Punk went on to say that they were very delighted with how West's single turned out to be. The two had first heard the new song on Power 106 while on a San Francisco flight. As de Homem-Christo stated, "Our song had a good sound, but when [the radio DJ] put Kanye's record on, the sound was really fat. It sounds really big." De Homem-Christo also clarified, "It's not a collaboration in the studio, but the vibe of the music we do separately connected in what [West] did with the song."

Recording
"Stronger" was recorded in three recording studios: Ape Sounds in Tokyo, Sony Music Studios in New York City, and The Record Plant in Los Angeles. The track utilizes a vocal sample of "Harder, Better, Faster, Stronger" (2001) by French house duo Daft Punk, which itself features a re-worked instrumental of "Cola Bottle Baby" (1979), a song by the funk keyboardist Edwin Birdsong. Daft Punk had added "a melodic chorus with a descending chord sequence," which was the basis for West's sample. West subsequently "slowed down and loosened the rhythm, and overdubbed pulsating synths, evocative rapping and singing." After the filming of the single's music video, which began before he had even written its second verse, West returned to the studio to redo parts of "Stronger" and various other tracks he recorded for the album, watching films such as Total Recall for more ideas. West worked on "Stronger" with eight audio engineers and eleven mix engineers around the world and recorded over fifty versions of the track.

The final version of the song is credited to Manny Marroquin, a producer who mixed West's debut album, The College Dropout (2004). West and Marroquin first worked on the song together for fourteen hours at Larrabee North Studios in Los Angeles, followed by four three-hour sessions at Battery Studios in New York. Much of the song's keyboards and electric guitar accompaniment were added in New York by Mike Dean and Lamar "Mars" Edwards. West's sampling of Daft Punk had left many glitches within the clip, which Marroquin corrected by lowering the volume for several milliseconds on each. In crafting the song's distinctive four-to-the-floor rhythm, West and Marroquin employed multi–band compression and extreme EQ. This was primarily to ensure that the single would play well in club atmospheres.

West mixed "Stronger" seventy-five times, as he could not seem to get the kick drum to sound precisely the way that he wanted it to, amongst other issues. Still feeling dissatisfied after hearing number-one hit single inside a club played alongside Timbaland's 2007 single "The Way I Are", which at that time was his favorite hip-hop beat, West decided to enlist the record producer to assist him in redoing the song's drum programming. In the end, Manny Marroquin and Kanye West auditioned twelve kick drums, going back to the original — which is a mix of three kick drums — shortly before completing the track. The song's final arrangement in Pro Tools included over 100 layers. This completed version of "Stronger" contains a master use of Edwin Birdsong's "Cola Bottle Baby."

Composition

"Stronger" is a hip-hop song that lasts for a duration of five minutes and eleven seconds (5:11). The composition incorporates elements from a range of electronic music genres, including house, electro, techno and electronica. According to the sheet music published at Musicnotes.com by Universal Music Publishing Group, "Stronger" is composed in the key of E-flat minor (Em) and set in the time signature of common time, with a moderate tempo of 104 beats per minute. The song follows a basic sequence of Em–D–Am7–C–B as its chord progression. The stark musical composition is electronic in nature, employing distorted, layered synthesizers as its prominent instrument. The production of the track revolves around a vocoder-affected vocal sample of "Harder, Better, Faster, Stronger" by the French house duo Daft Punk. As one of the most musically complex arrangements on Graduation, West experiments with an elliptic song structure that makes extensive use of descending synth-bass and alternating backbeats.

The song starts with its refrain, where the cut-up sample of Daft Punk's robotic vocals can be heard at a decreased tempo. Following its introduction, West raps the refrain as the vocal sample is played continuously in the background. During the refrain, the track maintains a distinctive four-to-the-floor rhythmic pattern which takes cues from house-music.  For the verses, West switches to a syncopated hip-hop beat; propulsive programmed drums replete with rumbling kick drums that stomps over the layered synths. He integrates additional vocal hooks into the song's bridge while also adjusting its refrain and at one interval includes an ad libitum. At its close, the track enters a flanging extended outro that contains a synth-heavy breakdown. It comes complete with abrasive keyboard stabs, operatic harmonies and somber electric guitars which chime in unison.

For the track, West evokes his rapping technique to a thumping beat. Within two verses, he delivers his defiant lyrics at loud volume with fragmented, forceful flow that makes use of rests as the song builds into a bombastic crescendo. With a simplified, halting vocal delivery, West manipulates his articulation to match the melodies of the musical composition. An inspirational aspect can be found within "Stronger," where West speaks about the resolve that comes when one is faced with adversity, with defiant lyrics at the song's refrain that paraphrase Friedrich Nietzsche's famous dictum: "What does not kill him, makes him stronger." Regarding the lyrical content, West describes the abrasive track as an "emancipation," as he uses the first verse to vent his pent-up frustration over mistakes that he had made in the past year. In addition, West views the single as a return with the help from his fans, hence the "I need you right now" lyric which serves as a hook that follows the refrain. As he told an interviewer for The Guardian, "It's also a message from me to my fans that I'm coming back after a time away and I need you right now, to help me come back."

Release

Live performances

West performed a partial version of "Stronger" live at the Concert for Diana held at Wembley Stadium on July 1, 2007, to a crowd of 63,000 people. An estimated 500 million people watched the event in over 140 countries. Daft Punk made a surprise appearance at the 50th Grammy Awards on February 10, 2008, to join West in performing a reworked version of the song on stage at the Staples Center in Los Angeles. A press release specified that this was the very first televised live performance by Daft Punk in their career. In an interview, de Homem-Christo specified that the live performance of "Stronger" at the 50th Grammy Awards was "truly a collaboration from the start. We really did it all hand in hand."

During his live performance at Coachella in 2011, West performed a version with altered lyrics in the second verse of the track to insult his ex-girlfriend Amber Rose. Following on from this, it was rumoured that there was a confrontation between West and Amber's then-boyfriend Wiz Khalifa, which Khalifa dismissed as being untrue. West performed the song at the 2011 Victoria's Secret Fashion Show, he was due to perform in 2007 but dropped out due to the death of his mother.

Legal issues
In 2010, Vincent Peters sued West, arguing "Stronger" is an illegitimate copy of a song he recorded in 2006. Peters claimed that he handed a copy of his track to John Monopoly, West's business manager, who, according to Peters, gave the song to West. Both songs share the title, make reference to model Kate Moss, and feature chorus lyrics that rhyme "wronger" and "longer". A federal judge dismissed the claim, finding no substantial similarity, but Peters went to the 7th Circuit Court of Appeals. West's lawyers claim both derive their respective chorus lyrics from Friedrich Nietzsche's famous dictum, "What does not kill him, makes him stronger." In 2012, the 7th Circuit Court of Appeals ruled in West's favor, ordering the lawsuit dismissed. Diane Wood, the presiding judge, noted that Nietzsche's dictum had been employed in popular works for decades, including Kelly Clarkson's "Stronger (What Doesn't Kill You)", a hit single at the time. The Hollywood Reporter quoted the ruling: "Although the fact that both songs quote from a 19th century German philosopher might, at first blush, seem to be an unusual coincidence, West correctly notes that the aphorism has been repeatedly invoked in song lyrics over the past century."

Commercial performance
"Stronger" entered the Billboard Hot 100 on the charting week of August 11, 2007 at number forty-seven, the highest debut single on the chart that week. Over the next eight weeks, the song steadily climbed upwards, eventually reaching the number one position on the charting week of September 29, 2007, pushing the previous week's chart topper, Soulja Boy Tell 'Em's "Crank That (Soulja Boy)" into the number two position. However, the following week, "Crank That (Soulja Boy)" replaced "Stronger" atop the charts, making West's single reach its peak for only one week. It is West's third number-one single in the United States, following on from "Slow Jamz" in 2004, and "Gold Digger" in 2005, respectively.

After becoming West's first number one single in the UK, "Stronger" went on to be met by widespread international success, reaching number-one in Canada and New Zealand. The song debuted at number three in the United Kingdom and rose to become West's very first British number one single. Climbing on downloads alone, it surpassed the prior week's number one single, Robyn's "With Every Heartbeat". "Stronger" also spent 18 weeks on the German Singles Chart and peaked at number 17. The song ended 2007 as the 19th best-selling, and sixth best-selling digital single in the UK. "Stronger" was the sixth best selling song on iTunes in 2007. "Stronger" was the second best-selling digital song of 2007 in Canada.

In February 2010, it was revealed that "Stronger" was the 16th most-downloaded song of all time on iTunes. It was the 17th best selling digital song of al time in the US by August 2010. As of March 2013, the single has sold five million copies in the US. In 2017, it was revealed that "Stronger" had stayed in the ARIA Top 500 for ten straight years, making it the longest running song on the chart with 522 weeks. In October 2021, "Stronger" was certified Diamond by the RIAA. The song is the most streamed song released in 2007 on Spotify.

Critical reception
The track was well received by music critics. Ann Powers of the Los Angeles Times praised West's performance: "On 'Stronger,' he pushes himself like a runner on a treadmill, always on the verge of losing his breath." Although Louis Pattison of NME criticized what he viewed as "brazen theft" from Daft Punk, he called the song "a silicone-hearted vocoder serenade, beefed up with hoover-like synthesisers." Anna Pickard of The Guardian praised it for the Daft Punk sample, viewing the track as opening with "the immediate familiarity of a Daft Punk sample" and the sample as "working well over this thumping beat".

"Stronger" appeared in numerous year-end lists; Spin named "Stronger" the best song of 2007, The Village Voice ranked "Stronger" at number seven on their annual year-end critics' poll Pazz & Jop. Rockdelux named it the second best foreign song of 2007. Blitz listed it the ninth best song of 2007. MTV named "Stronger" the sixth best song of 2007. Thought Catalog listed the song as the eleventh best Pop song of 2007. Consequence of Sound named it the 17th best song of 2007. "Stronger" was placed 20th in Australia's annual Triple J Hottest 100. Rolling Stone named it the eleventh best song of 2007, elsewhere in the magazine's decade-end readers' poll the song was named the sixth best single of the 2000s.  Furthermore, a 2013 Rolling Stone reader's poll ranked "Stronger" as West's eighth best song to that point.

Music video

Background
The "Stronger" music video was directed and produced by Hype Williams, with director of photography John Perez, editor Peter Johnson, executive producer Susan Linss and post supervisor Amelia Torabi. Post production and visual effects were done at RhinoFX by VFX Supervisor Vico Sharabani. Williams explained that the decision to work with West again was natural after he heard the song, stating "When I heard the record I thought it was something I could kind of dive in with him on it. I felt like my whole world made sense to do it. He has a lot of relationships with a lot of filmmakers but I think this particular song spoke to me."

The video explores life in a sleek space-age robot world set in Japan, and was filmed guerrilla-style over twelve days in Tokyo and Los Angeles in April 2007, featuring shots in Aoyama clothing store A Bathing Ape and Harajuku clothing store Billionaire Boys Club/Ice Cream. The video features appearances by a real-life Japanese motorcycle gang, singer-model Cassie Ventura, and the two principal actors from the film Daft Punk's Electroma dressed as Daft Punk. The video also features multiple scenes which pay homage to the 1988 anime film Akira. These include the light effects on the motorbikes, the hospital scenes and West being scanned by machines.

Development
West approached Island/Def Jam chairman Antonio "L.A." Reid with only a general concept for the video, with no storyboard, asking for $1.2 million to fund four videos. The treatment was simply "Kanye and Hype in Japan". West and Williams had the vision in their brains, but they didn't have anything on paper. There was no storyboard. They just wanted to get a bunch of footage." West, a fan of Japanese directors and anime, had desired to shoot in Japan to give the video a futuristic look, in line with the creative design of Graduation as a whole.

In the clip's original storyline, West plays the part of a man in a motorcycle gang, who gets into a bar fight with Japanese rivals and gets a beaten so bad that the doctors have to rebuild him. Both West and Williams had originally planned to integrate scenes from the film into the video. but decided against so to produce something more impressionistic. Williams explained this to SOHH "He was always inspired by Akira, there was a point where we really dove in and wound up filming parts of that movie for the video, but we decided to back off of it and do something a little more abstract for the final version. So originally it went from inspired by -- to us really diving into that world and giving him a piece of the story and that kind of transmutated into the video that's out now.”

West and his entourage got no permits to film, simply having interpreters explain the situation to locals. The clip features shots of a real-life riot of a Japanese politician; it took place directly outside of Williams' hotel, and West encouraged the director to go out and film it. West was not satisfied when going over the footage back in the United States, he spent ten weeks in editing suites editing the video. He decided to abandon the storyline and choose a video with "the hottest shots possible," going to New York for additional filming at the Jacob K. Javits Convention Center. Williams was unable to film additional footage, with the video already extensively over-budget, so West hired a local team. The video's most famous shots were filmed in New York, and feature West wearing a pair of Alain Mikli shutter shades, which he requested from the designer specifically for the video. Dissatisfied with the footage of said shots, due to the director of photography not being the same as Williams' DOP, West distorted the footage to resemble what it might look like as if it were broadcast over a cathode ray tube television set. Further pickup shots were filmed in Los Angeles, including segments featuring Daft Punk, who were coincidentally in L.A. at the time and attended the video shoot. Williams explained that the video was West's vision saying, "He's a strong filmmaker in his own right, a very well-respected and strong filmmaker in my book. He really did a great job executing his vision. I was kinda his co-partner on this one."

Post-production
Don "Don C" Crawley, West's manager and confidant, described his perfectionist attitude whilst editing the clip:
Kanye almost had a brain aneurysm, editing this video for three months. Literally, 10 weeks of editing going back in. Then he still was not satisfied, so he shot more footage in New York. [...] Kanye put everything else on halt. He was in the editing suite till 4 or 5 in the morning. He went way over budget editing, sitting in them expensive editing suites. He kept going — and not only kept going, but he wanted to shoot more footage.
Rhinofx VFX Supervisor Vico Sharabani said that the process of this project was totally unconventional.
“Kanye approached the creation of this video the same way he writes a song. He wanted to put different elements together and according to how they relate to each-other he would then take the next step. This made for a very creative environment with a quickly-evolving vision. Originally, there were supposed to be just four machine shots, but when we showed them the style frame we created for the machine, Kanye decided to re-edit the video around the machine, adding a dozen more shots. Kanye is a very talented visual artist and his passion translates to the way he manages the process. The whole process was very intimate and fast paced, with ideas flying around 24/7. It was a truly amazing creative collaboration between Kanye, Hype, our team, and editorial; everyone contributed to every aspect of the job. It was also very rewarding to hear of the video nomination for the MTV music awards.”

A rough cut of the video first premiered at the Tribeca Studios in New York City on June 19, 2007, with West editing the clip until the last minute. Elsewhere, Williams revealed that an extended, limited-edition version of the music video was due for an internet type of release, but this ultimately never come to fruition.”

Cover versions and media usage
The JabbaWockeeZ performed to this song in the first season finale of America's Best Dance Crew as their victory performance for being crowned champions. Thirty Seconds to Mars performed a cover version of "Stronger" on BBC Radio 1, which is featured on Radio 1's Live Lounge – Volume 2 and a UK release of the single "From Yesterday". The cover features a slower tempo on guitar and omits the profanity, which was reworded by their lead singer Jared Leto. Leto said that he "hoped that Kanye [was] okay" with the editing. The song was also cover by Swiss metalcore band Breakdown of Sanity.

The song can be heard for the promo of the 2007 film The Kingdom. It can also be heard as the introductory song of the Baltimore Orioles, Toronto Raptors, New York Mets, Texas Longhorns, Washington Wizards, Cincinnati Reds and Tampa Bay Rays. The New York Giants entered the field to this song at Super Bowl XLII and during most of their home games during the season. The New York Rangers and Chicago Blackhawks play it at every home game as well. The song is also featured in Season 4 Episode 4 of Entourage as background music in a night club. The A-Trak remix of the song is used in an advert for the short-lived American TV show Bionic Woman. This song is also used by Animal Planet to promote their new show Jockeys, appearing in commercials as well as being the series' opening theme. UK rapper Kano has freestyled over this song on his mixtape MC No.1. The song also appeared on the trailer for the videogame Top Spin 4. In 2008 "Stronger" was featured in the movie Never Back Down, when the main character, Jake Tyler, enters the "Beatdown" tournament.

"Stronger" is featured in (and is on the soundtrack for) for the 2011 film The Hangover Part II. In 2013, on the HBO show Girls, Allison Williams's character performed the song at a slower tempo. "Stronger" was also used as a track that can be selected on the Hollywood Rip Ride Rockit at Universal Studios Florida. "Stronger" was used in a gameplay TV spot for the 2016 video game Watch Dogs 2. The song was used in a Nescafé trailer for the Dolce Gusto Drop. The song appears in the BBC Radio 1Xtra episode 10 Moments That Made Kanye West.

Legacy
Considered one of West's most radio-friendly songs, "Stronger" has been credited with not only encouraging other hip-hop artists to incorporate house and electronica elements into their music, but also with playing a part in the revival of disco and electro-infused music in the late 2000s. The song also brought Daft Punk to prominence in the United States; Rolling Stone credited it with "the beginning of the group's path to mainstream success." The song helped sales of Daft Punk's Harder, Better, Faster, Stronger go from 1,000 per week to between 5,000 and 7,000. The song has been looked at as a turning point in how the talents of West were viewed in his career and it brought him more commercial success.

In 2011, Stronger was voted "the greatest workout song of all time" after topping a nationwide poll by Gold's Gym. "Stronger" has been ranked as the third most popular workout song of all time on Spotify. In 2020, uDiscoverMusic named it the best workout song of all time.

In 2021 the song was listed at number 500 on Rolling Stone's 500 Greatest Songs of All Time.

Accolades

Track listing

CD single (International)
 "Stronger" (Album version) – 5:15
 "Stronger" (Instrumental) – 5:15
 "Can't Tell Me Nothing" – 4:34
 "Stronger" (Video) – 4:29

Promo 12" single
A-side
 "Stronger" (Clean)
 "Stronger" (Explicit)
B-side
 "Stronger" (Radio edit)
 "Stronger" (Instrumental)
 "Bittersweet" (Bonus track)

CD single (UK)
 "Stronger" (Album Version) – 5:14
 "Can't Tell Me Nothing" (Album Version) – 4:32

12" picture disc (UK)
 "Stronger" (Radio edit)
 "Stronger" (LP dirty)
 "Stronger" (Instrumental)
 "Stronger" (LP clean)

iTunes Remixes single
 "Stronger (A-Trak Remix)" – 4:36
 "Stronger (Andrew Dawson Remix)" – 4:46

Personnel
Information taken from Graduation liner notes.
 Songwriters: Kanye West, Thomas Bangalter, Guy-Manuel de Homem-Christo, Edwin Birdsong
 Producers: Kanye West, Mike Dean (extended outro)
 Additional drum programming: Timbaland
 Recorder: Seiji
 Mix engineer: Manny Marroquin
 Assistant engineers: Kengo Sakura, Bram Tobey, Jason Agel, Nate Hertweck, Jared Robbins
 Keyboards: Andy Chatterley, La Mar "Mars" Edwards
 Guitar: Mike Dean

Charts

Weekly charts

Year-end charts

Decade-end charts

Certifications and sales

See also
 List of best-selling singles in Australia
 List of best-selling singles in the United States
 List of Canadian Hot 100 number-one singles of 2007
 List of number-one singles from the 2000s (New Zealand)
 List of UK Singles Chart number ones of the 2000s
 List of Billboard Hot 100 number-one singles of 2007
 List of Billboard Mainstream Top 40 number-one songs of 2007

References

External links
 "Stronger" lyrics at MTV
 "Stronger" lyrics at Yahoo! Music

2007 singles
2007 songs
Alternative hip hop songs
Billboard Hot 100 number-one singles
Canadian Hot 100 number-one singles
Electronica songs
Grammy Award for Best Rap Solo Performance
Kanye West songs
Music videos directed by Hype Williams
Number-one singles in New Zealand
Roc-A-Fella Records singles
Song recordings produced by Kanye West
Songs about robots
Songs involved in plagiarism controversies
Songs written by Guy-Manuel de Homem-Christo
Songs written by Kanye West
Songs written by Thomas Bangalter
Thirty Seconds to Mars songs
UK Singles Chart number-one singles